The Main Road, also known as Grand Avenue and as Stafford Road, on Cumberland Island in Cumberland Island National Seashore near St. Marys, Georgia was built in 1870.  It was listed on the National Register of Historic Places in 1984.

Portions existed by 1802; it was complete by 1870.

References

National Register of Historic Places in Georgia (U.S. state)
Buildings and structures completed in 1870
National Register of Historic Places in Cumberland Island National Seashore